The non-marine molluscs of Andorra are a part of the fauna of Andorra. That country is land-locked and therefore it has no marine molluscs, only land and freshwater species, including snails, slugs and freshwater bivalves.

Freshwater gastropods

Land gastropods 

Chondrinidae
 Abida occidentalis (Fagot, 1888)
 Abida polyodon (Draparnaud, 1801)
 Abida secale (Draparnaud, 1801) - the subspecies Abida secale andorrensis (Bourguignat, 1863) is native to Andorra and surrounding Spain.
 Abida vergniesiana (Küster, 1847)

Agriolimacidae
 Deroceras laeve (Müller, 1774)
 Deroceras agreste (Linnaeus, 1758)
 Deroceras reticulatum (Müller, 1774)
 Deroceras altimirai Altena, 1969
 Deroceras levisarcobelum de Winter, 1986
 Deroceras rodnae Grossu et Lupu, 1965

Limacidae
 Malacolimax tenellus (Müller, 1774)
 Lehmannia marginata (Müller, 1774)
 Lehmannia valentiana (Férussac, 1821)
 Limax maximus Linnaeus, 1758

Boettgerillidae
 Boettgerilla pallens Simroth, 1912

Arionidae
 Arion lusitanicus Mabille, 1868
 Arion subfuscus (Draparnaud, 1805)
 Arion hortensis Férussac, 1819
 Arion intermedius (Normand, 1852)

Hygromiidae
 Hygromia golasi Prieto & Puente, 1992 - endemic

Bivalves

See also 
 List of non-marine molluscs of France
 List of non-marine molluscs of Spain

References 

Andorra
Molluscs
Andorra
Andorra